Achyuth Kumar is an Indian actor who predominantly works in Kannada cinema. Born in the town of Belur, in the district of Hassan and brought up in Tiptur. He graduated in bachelor of commerce from the Kalpatharu First Grade College, which was then under the University of Bangalore. He is well known for his performances in the films, KGF 1 and 2, Kantara, Sidlingu and Lucia & he has won 3 South Filmfare Awards and 2 
Karnataka State Film Awards, one each in  
Best Supporting Actor and Best Actor categories so far.

Career
Kumar began acting during his time as a college-going student Tiptur, Karnataka, along with his theatre groups like Geleyarabalaga, Mungaru Hudugaru and Abhinaya Theatre Group, under the guidance of Nataraj Huliyar. Later, he started his training as an actor at Ninasam. Working in theatre during the time, he was chosen by Girish Kasaravalli to play a pivotal role in his television soap Gharvabhanga in 2000. In the soap Moodala Mane, Kumar played a supportive colleague to the daughter of the protagonist. In Preethi Illada Mele, he played the eldest son of a judge (played by Anant Nag).

Kumar's career in films began in 2007 when he signed to play the father of the female lead in Moggina Manasu (2008) and gangster Oil Kumar in Aa Dinagalu (2007), both Kannada films. He went on to gain a reputation as a character actor and appeared in around 12 films per year. He also appeared in a couple of Tamil films. However, it was in the 2013 film Lucia, that Kumar received widespread appreciation. In the film, he played Shankaranna, a movie theater owner and employer of Nikhil, played by Sathish Ninasam. The performance won him the Filmfare Award for Best Supporting Actor.

In Hejjegalu (2013), Kumar played Kodanda, a gambling addict who squanders money taken on loan, being tried to reform by his young daughter. The performance won him the Karnataka State Film Award for Best Supporting Actor. He received praise for his portrayal of Shivappa, a scavenger in Amaraavati  (2017). In Urvi (2017), based on the menace of child trafficking, he played Devarugunda, an influential man who kidnaps women, rapes them and forces them into prostitution. Archana Nathan of The Hindu wrote, "Achutha Kumar performs well, but one wishes that his character had been given some more depth and background."

In the 2022 drama film, Kantara, Kumar played a treacherous feudal lord Devendra Suttooru, scheming to snatch land from the tribal community after appearing to help them. Deccan Herald wrote, "... given how brilliant Achyuth is, the character's sudden switch in the trait is made invisible by his effortless transformation." The New Indian Express termed his performance "powerful".

Filmography

References

External links
 

Living people
Male actors in Kannada cinema
Indian male film actors
Male actors from Bangalore
21st-century Indian male actors
Filmfare Awards South winners
Year of birth missing (living people)
Male actors in Telugu cinema